Hildoceratoidea, formerly Hildoceratacaea, is a superfamily of  compressed or planulate ammonites, some tending to develop acute outer rims; generally with arcuate or sigmoidal ribs. Aptichus were found in place are double-valved.

Hildoceratoidea is an upper Lower to lower Middle Jurassic group belonging to the Ammonitina that unites the Hildoceratidae, Hammatoceratidae, Graphoceratidae, and Sonniniidae. In some taxonomies the name Phymatoceratidae is substituted for the Hammatoceratidae

Hildoceratidae, which is the ancestral family, is derived from the Acanthopleuroceratinae, a subfamily in the Eoderoceratoidean family, Polyorphitidae. The Stephanoceratoidea, Perisphinctoidea, and Haploceratoidea have their source in the Hammatoceratidae which is derived from the Hildoceratidae.

References

 
Jurassic ammonites
Ammonitida superfamilies
Ammonitina
Early Jurassic first appearances
Middle Jurassic extinctions